Doug Reuter (born March 17, 1949) is an American politician in the state of Minnesota. He served in the Minnesota House of Representatives.

References

Republican Party members of the Minnesota House of Representatives
1949 births
Living people
Politicians from Superior, Wisconsin